Francis Cuffe may refer to:

 Francis Cuffe (died 1694), Irish politician, MP for Mayo 1692–93
 Francis Cuffe (died 1717), Irish politician, MP for Mayo 1715–17

See also 
 Cuffe (disambiguation)